John C. Dugan (born June 3, 1955) is an American attorney who served as the 29th comptroller of the currency from August 2005 to August 14, 2010. He has since worked as the chairman of Citigroup.

Early life and education
Dugan was born in Washington, D.C. He earned a Bachelor of Arts degree from the University of Michigan and a Juris Doctor from Harvard Law School.

Career
In September 2007, Dugan was appointed chairman of the Joint Forum, which is a group of senior financial sector regulators from the United States, Canada, Europe, Japan, and Australia that deals with issues common to the banking, securities, and insurance industries, including supervision of conglomerates.

Dugan served as the under secretary of the treasury for domestic finance in 1992 and served in Department of the Treasury from 1989 to 1993. Before that he was minority counsel and minority general counsel for the United States Senate Committee on Banking, Housing, and Urban Affairs, from 1985 to 1989. He was also director of Minbanc, a charitable organization, and was a member of the American Bar Association's committee on banking law. Before serving as comptroller, Dugan worked for 12 years as a lobbyist representing the banking industry.

Dugan acted as chairman of the Joint Forum on the Basel Committee on Banking Supervision from 2007 through December 2009.

Personal life
Dugan is married and has two children.

References

External links
Office of the Comptroller of the Currency
National Bank Customer Assistance
John C. Dugan biography

American chairpersons of corporations
Citigroup employees
Living people
University of Michigan alumni
Comptrollers in the United States
United States Comptrollers of the Currency
Harvard Law School alumni
1955 births
People associated with Covington & Burling
George W. Bush administration personnel
Obama administration personnel